Megan Jean and the KFB is the husband and wife musical duo, Megan Jean and Byrne Klay, from Charleston, South Carolina, USA. The band is known for its eclectic sound and unique instrumentation.

While writing songs for the band's second album, the two appeared in more than 200 performances in 2011 in 32 states, opened for acts including Shovels & Rope and appeared on the PBS music travel series Music Voyager.

Music
Jean and Klay met in New York in 2004 and shortly thereafter formed Megan Jean and the Klay Family Band. Performing original songs led by Jean's gutsy vocals and often dark lyrics and melodic sensibility, the band began developing a devoted fanbase in local clubs and venues.

The two sold most of their belongings and booked their own tour, beginning in fall 2007, spending 14 months completely transient until settling down in Charleston. They released their first album, Autumn, in 2007, and their second, Dead Woman Walking, in 2010 under the label Guts and Know How Records. They subsequently began touring full-time across the eastern United States.

They self-released their second full-length album, The Devil Herself in February 2013.

Biographies
Megan Jean was born on May 25, 1983, in Tunkhannock, Pennsylvania, and grew up primarily on the west coast, in California, Oregon, and Washington. She moved to New York when she was 18 to attend Tisch School of the Arts at New York University, studying musical theater with a concentration on voice. Her first day of classes was September 11, 2001. Both of her parents played guitar and wrote original music, which is where she initially learned about music composition and began to play guitar at age 11. She is known for having absolute pitch as well as playing the washboard, which she started in 2009 after someone lent her one. Before forming the band, she played the New York acoustic club scene and shared the stage with Kevin Devine, Kaki King, Langhorne Slim, Kimya Dawson and Paleface.

Byrne Klay was born on March 29, 1980, in Mexico City, Mexico and raised in White Plains, New York. Klay studied double bass at the Oberlin Conservatory of Music and New School University. He toured for several years with a punk band called Dynamite Club, visiting Japan, Taiwan, Europe, Australia and the United States. He performed on one album, It's A Lot Deeper Than Most People Actually Think. Klay played a lot of experimental music with such notables as Assif Tsahar, Cooper-Moore, Mike Pride and Todd Colburn. Klay played bass in the Brooklyn alt-country band Sugarpine, and was featured on their 2006 album Ball Peen Hammer. He learned to play banjo in 2008, studying from the Internet.

Reception
Megan Jean and the KFB has received acclaim from media in the United States as well as the United Kingdom. Jim Reed of Connect Savannah wrote "...the intriguing combination of Jean's literate lyricism (and almost theatrical approach to vocals) and Klay's highly disciplined composition as the backbone of their sparse, but emotionally satisfying style,"  and Andy Riggs of Americana UK acclaimed the band's "superb songs and intimate sound".

In 2012, the band was featured in an episode of the internationally acclaimed music and travel series, Music Voyager, titled "Cradle of Country Music", dedicated to the music scene in Bristol, Tennessee.

References

External links
Official website
YouTube channel

American musical duos
Married couples
Musicians from South Carolina